This is a list of settlements in Phthiotis, Greece:

A

 Achinos
 Achladi
 Achladia
 Agia Marina, Stylida
 Agia Marina, Tithorea
 Agia Paraskevi, Lamia
 Agia Paraskevi, Tithorea
 Agia Triada
 Agios Charalampos
 Agios Georgios Domokou
 Agios Georgios Tymfristou
 Agios Konstantinos
 Agios Serafeim
 Agios Sostis
 Agios Stefanos
 Agnanti
 Agrapidia
 Amfikleia
 Amouri
 Anatoli
 Anavra
 Anthili
 Anydro
 Archani
 Argyria
 Argyrochori
 Arkitsa
 Asvesti
 Atalanti
 Avlaki

B
 Bralos

D

 Dafni
 Damasta
 Delfino
 Dikastro
 Divri
 Domokos
 Drymaia
 Dyo Vouna

E

 Ekkara
 Elateia
 Eleftherochori
 Exarchos

F

 Frantzis
 Fteri
 Fyliadon

G

 Gardiki
 Gavrakia
 Gerakli
 Giannitsou
 Glyfa
 Gorgopotamos
 Goulemi
 Goura
 Grammeni

I
 Irakleia

K

 Kainourgio
 Kalamaki
 Kalapodi
 Kallidromo
 Kallithea
 Kamena Vourla
 Kampia
 Kanalia
 Karavomylos
 Karyes
 Kastanea
 Kastri
 Kato Tithorea
 Kloni
 Kolokythia
 Komma
 Komnina
 Kompotades
 Koromili
 Kostalexis
 Koumaritsi
 Kyparissi
 Kyriakochori
 Kyrtoni

L

 Ladikou
 Lamia
 Larymna
 Lefka
 Lefkas
 Lefkochori
 Leianokladi
 Litoselo
 Livanates 
 Longitsi
 Loutra Ypatis
 Lychnos
 Lygaria

M

 Makrakomi
 Makri
 Makrolivado
 Makryrrachi
 Malesina
 Mantasia
 Marmara
 Martino
 Mavrilo
 Megali Kapsi
 Megali Vrysi
 Megaplatanos
 Melitaia
 Mendenitsa
 Merkada
 Mesaia Kapsi
 Mesochori
 Mesopotamia
 Mexiates
 Modi
 Molos
 Moschochori
 Moschokarya
 Myloi

N

 Nea Makrisi
 Neo Krikello
 Neo Monastiri
 Neochori, Domokos
 Neochori Tymfristou
 Neochori Ypatis
 Neraida
 Nikolitsi

O

 Oiti
 Omvriaki

P

 Palaia Giannitsou
 Palaiochori Dorieon
 Palaiochori Tymfristou
 Palaiokastro
 Palaiokerasia
 Palaiovracha
 Palamas
 Panagia
 Panagitsa
 Pappa
 Pavliani
 Pelasgia
 Peristeri
 Perivlepto
 Perivoli
 Perivoli Domokou
 Petroto
 Pitsi
 Pitsiota
 Platanos
 Platystomo
 Polydendri
 Pougkakia
 Pournari
 Proskynas
 Ptelea
 Pyrgos

R

 Raches
 Regkinio
 Roditsa
 Rodonia
 Rovoliari

S

 Sfaka
 Skarfeia
 Sofiada
 Spartia
 Spercheiada
 Stavros
 Stirfaka
 Stylida
 Syka

T

 Thavmako
 Thermopyles
 Tithorea
 Tithroni
 Tragana
 Trilofo
 Tsoukka
 Tymfristos

V

 Vardali
 Vardates
 Vasilika
 Vathykoilo
 Velesiotes
 Vitoli
 Vouzi

X

 Xylikoi
 Xyniada

Y
 Ypati

Z

 Zeli
 Zilefto

See also
List of towns and villages of Greece

By municipality

 
Phthiotis